The Aisha-i-Durani School or Durani High School is a girls' school in Kabul, Afghanistan. It is one of two schools reconstructed with German help after the fall of the Taliban in 2001, the other being Amani High School.

References

External links

 Durani High School
 United Nations report

Schools in Kabul
International schools in Afghanistan
German international schools in Asia
Girls' schools in Afghanistan